Leemire LaTray Goldwire (born November 24, 1985) is an American former professional basketball player.

Professional career
Goldwire joined the Macedonian League club Rabotnički, in 2013. He signed with the Argentine League club Regatas Corrientes in 2017.

Personal life
Goldmire's cousin Anthony, was also a professional basketball player, and he played in the NBA.

References

External links
Latinbasket.com Profile

1985 births
Living people
Aigaleo B.C. players
American expatriate basketball people in Argentina
American expatriate basketball people in Bulgaria
American expatriate basketball people in Greece
American expatriate basketball people in Italy
American expatriate basketball people in North Macedonia
American expatriate basketball people in Turkey
American men's basketball players
Basket Brescia Leonessa players
Basketball players from Florida
Charlotte 49ers men's basketball players
Eskişehir Basket players
Fulgor Libertas Forlì players
Guards (basketball)
KK Rabotnički players
PBC Academic players
People from Palm Beach Gardens, Florida
Regatas Corrientes basketball players
S.S. Felice Scandone players
Sioux Falls Skyforce players
Sportspeople from the Miami metropolitan area